Nadina Bhagya is a 1970 Indian Kannada-language film, directed by R. Nagendra Rao and produced by S. Narayanappa and N. Narasimharaju. The film stars R. Nagendra Rao, R. N. Sudarshan and T. R. Narasimharaju with Rajkumar in an extended cameo of 25 minutes in the last half an hour of the movie in the role of a crime investigator. The film has musical score by R. Rathnam.

Cast

Rajkumar as Balu (extended cameo)
R. Nagendra Rao as Dharmaiah
R. N. Sudarshan as Anand
Narasimharaju as Boregowda
K. R. Seetharama Sastry
B. M. Venkatesh
Srilalitha
Surekha
Chandra
Shanthamma
Bharadwaj
Kosu Samputani
M. V. Gowda
Vasudev
Ramakumar
Ramanna
Sathyaprakash
Devadas
B. R. Jayaram
G. M. Nanjappa
Susheelamma
Pushpavathi
Vijaykumar

Soundtrack

References

External links
 

1970 films
1970s Kannada-language films